Eógan mac Néill (modern orthography: Eoghan mac Néill) (reportedly died 465) was a son of Niall Noígiallach and the eponymous ancestor of the Cenél nEógain (kindred of Eoghan) branch of the Northern Uí Néill. The Cenél Eoghan would found the over-kingdom of Ailech and later Tír Eoghain, which would span the greater part of Ulster. His burial place is said to be in the Inishowen Peninsula in County Donegal, Ireland which was named after him. The historical accuracy or existence of Eógan and his father however are unknown.

Overview 
Eogan mac Néill is claimed as having been a close friend of Saint Patrick and received Patrick's blessing. With his brother, the High King Lóegaire mac Néill (d.462), he was one of the judges in a dispute over the succession to Amalgaid (d.440), king of Connacht, among his sons competing to rule their territory of Tir Amalgaidh in northwest Connacht.

Eoghan is reputedly buried at St. Patrick's Church in Iskaheen, Inishowen, Donegal. A plaque there states, "Eoghan Prince of Inis Eóghain, Son of Niall of the Nine Hostages. Died 465 of grief for his brother Conall [Gulban].  Baptised by Patrick and buried in Uisce Chaoin".

His sons included Muiredach mac Eógain, Fergus mac Eógain, founder of the Cenél Fergusa, and Anghusa mac Eógain, founder of the Cenél Anghusa.

Notes

References

 Annals of Ulster at CELT: Corpus of Electronic Texts at University College Cork
 Byrne, Francis John (2001), Irish Kings and High-Kings, Dublin: Four Courts Press, 
 Revised edition of McCarthy's synchronisms at Trinity College Dublin.

465 deaths
5th-century Irish monarchs
Kings of Ailech
People from County Tyrone
Year of birth unknown